John Millar (born 8 December 1966) is a Scottish former professional footballer, who played as a midfielder for Chelsea, Hamilton Academical, Northampton Town, Blackburn Rovers, Heart of Midlothian, Raith Rovers, Livingston and Stirling Albion.

Chelsea
Millar joined Chelsea from Clyde Amateurs in August 1984. A Scottish under-18 International, in his first season at Stamford Bridge he captained the Chelsea Youth Team, playing left back or midfield. He made his senior debut for Chelsea in February 1986.

In his first season at Hearts, he contributed 41 league appearances and seven goals as the Edinburgh side finished runners-up in the 1991–92 Scottish Premier Division.

References

1966 births
Living people
Association football midfielders
Scottish footballers
Chelsea F.C. players
Hamilton Academical F.C. players
Northampton Town F.C. players
Blackburn Rovers F.C. players
Heart of Midlothian F.C. players
Raith Rovers F.C. players
Livingston F.C. players
Stirling Albion F.C. players
English Football League players
Scottish Football League players
Footballers from Coatbridge